Garden-based learning (GBL) encompasses programs, activities and projects in which the garden is the foundation for integrated learning, in and across disciplines, through active, engaging, real-world experiences that have personal meaning for children, youth, adults and communities in an informal outside learning setting. Garden-based learning is an instructional strategy that utilizes the garden as a teaching tool.  

The practice of garden-based learning is a growing global phenomenon largely seen in the United States, the United Kingdom and Australia. As of 2010, the National Gardening Association reported over 3,000 school gardens in the United States alone.

In some settings garden-based learning strategies are used entirely as the educational curriculum for multiple subjects and in others it supports or enriches the curriculum. Garden-based learning can contribute to all aspects of basic education on varying levels depending on the student and consistency of the garden-based learning program. Aspects of basic education benefits include but are not limited to academic skills, personal development, social development, moral development, vocational and/or subsistence skills, and life skills.

Benefits of garden-based learning among children and youth 

Landscape designers, teachers, and others consider school and community gardens to be one of the most notable positive trends in the nation today. These environments can foster science literacy and social skills, while enhancing an awareness of the link between plants in the landscape and our, food, clothing, shelter, and well-being.

Gardening projects provide children and youth with the carefree exploration of the natural world that occurs rarely in today's era of indoor living; it can also give young people the chance to develop a wide range of academic and social skills.

Noted benefits of garden-based learning programs among youth include increased nutrition awareness, environmental awareness, higher learning achievements, and increased life skills.

Increased nutrition awareness

Research indicates that youth who participate in garden-based learning programs increase their consumption of fresh fruits and vegetables, and gain new enthusiasm for fresh, nutritious vegetables they grow. It is the physical act of having the students' plant their own fruits and vegetables that gives them ownership and gets them more involved in their learning. Students can then learn about the nutritional values of food and multiple ways to prepare their own products in healthy ways to further progress their awareness of health issues. These two examples of physical acts of learning are what motivate healthier eating choices in and outside of the school setting.

Student Health 

Teachers also regarded the garden to be very effective at enhancing academic performance, physical activity, language arts, and healthy eating habits. Garden-based learning attempts to combat obesity by introducing students to healthy foods and providing opportunities to for outside experiential learning. Gardening intervention in schools may also aid in the improved health of children for the simple reason that students get 20% or more of their daily food intake from school depending on their socioeconomic backgrounds; families with lower income depending on school lunch even more than others.

Students and teachers have also reported that using GBL programs reduce stress. Reducing stress can result in increased mental health and boosted immune system. A boosted immune system means that the human body is stronger and heals more efficiently. This could help patients recovering from all diseases, wounds, illnesses and more. Hospitals and Primary care facilities would be an ideal spot to incorporate garden based learning.

Increased environmental awareness

Research highlights that high school students gain more positive attitudes about environmental issues after participating in a school garden program. Gardening has also been shown to increase scores on environmental attitude surveys of elementary school children.

Environmental attitude surveys generally include statements like the ones shown below and give the opportunity to rank those statements with a score of 1–5 (Strongly agree, agree, neutral, disagree, strongly disagree) The statements differ in complexity based on the grade level.
 I am worried about animals that are going extinct.
 Trying to protect the environment is my responsibility.
 I would come to school on Saturday to plant flowers. 
Environmental awareness and attitudes toward the environment is also seen to improve especially in urban schools where the garden-based learning programs in the schools may be some of the only times these students can connect with the outdoors away from city streets.

Higher Learning Achievements

Studies indicate students that participated in school gardening activities scored significantly higher on science achievement tests compared to students that did not experience any garden-based learning activities. Other research has indicated that weekly use of gardening activities and related classroom activities help improve science achievement test scores. The reasoning behind these improvements is connected to the holistic, integrated, hands-on, project based, cooperative and experiential learning activities that are all aspects of garden based education. In other words, student engagement in class is increased because they are being intrinsically motivated by "real world" experiences in a more informal setting than the classroom. However, it is important to note the extent to which students improve varies because every student learns differently and has preferred learning styles, which work best for them.

Increased Life Skills
Research has highlighted the many improvements in life skills that can be attributed to children's garden programs. These skills include: enhancement of moral education, increasing appreciation for nature, increasing responsibility, developing patience, increases in relationship skills, and increases in self-esteem, help students develop a sense of ownership and responsibility, and helps foster relationships with family members, peers, and their community.

Increased Education for the Disabled 
Research has shown that Garden-based learning can help improve important aspects of learning for people with special needs. GBL is used with special ed students to improve memory and motor skills. Some disabled students are not able to learn outside, but GBL inside has just the same impact as it would outdoors. Hands on projects such as Garden-based learning have been used to access a higher learning level for some disabled or special ed students.

Keys to successful garden-based learning programs 
Studies have been shown that children benefit from garden based learning programs. These benefits could include leadership growth, community involvement, and voluntary education which can lead to increased child development. Researched programs are more effective when one is to work through the entire process to understand how everything works in order. The orders involved in this education from beginning to end include planning, design, application, and review.

Some features of garden-based learning programs that develop positive qualities in youth

 Positive focus
 Children allowed to 'lead the way' in some aspects throughout the process.
 Proactive behavior
 Responsibility
 Availability to program
 Gives different view on education/academics or life itself.
 Participation
 Communication

Core uses for garden-based learning

Basic education uses

Academic Skills
 To support core academic training, particularly in science and math – real world hands on experiences
 Enrichment of core curriculum in language arts through introduction of new learning landscapes
 To support standards based education in countries with national or regional education standards
Teaching the biology of plant life and how it works.

Personal Development (Mental & Physical)
 To add a sense of excitement, adventure, emotional impact and aesthetic appreciation to learning
 To improve nutrition, diet and overall health 
 To teach the art and science of cooking with fresh products from the garden or local farms
 To re-establish the nature of a shared meal

Social & Moral Development
 To teach sustainable development
 To teach ecological literacy and/or environmental education
 To teach the joy and dignity of work
 To teach respect for public and private property

Vocational and/or Subsistence Skills
 To teach basic skills and vocational competencies
 To produce food and other commodities for subsistence consumption and trade
To produce crops for food and shelter

Life Skills

 To teach about food and fiber production in the garden
 To engage children in community service and environmental care
 To involve students in lessons of leadership and decision making
To involve students in voluntary beneficial situations
To improve problem solving
To improve critical thinking

Beyond basic education uses 
Besides basic education uses, the gardens can be used for other purposes as well.

Community Development
 Gardens often serve as a focal point for community dialogue, capacity building, and partnerships through a shared community garden space. 
 Gardens often organize individuals for action – for water delivery, cooperatives, and transportation

Food Security 
 Gardens can address hunger at the individual, family, and community levels through planning, growing, and sharing
 Gardens can be the beginning point for teaching and developing food policy

Sustainable Development
 Gardens are an appropriate arena to introduce children to the interconnections that link nature to economic systems and society

Vocational Education
 Gardens represent a historic and contemporary model for developing vocational skills in agriculture, natural resource management, and science

School Grounds Greening
 Gardens provides practical productive strategies to transform sterile school grounds into attractive and productive learning centers through the process of greening
 Hands-on activities in outdoor classrooms make learning more interesting while demonstrating other benefits such as decreased absenteeism and discipline problems
Can increase cognitive brain development

Relationship between humans and nature 
It has been proven that children are spending less and less time outdoors as new technology is invented. This trend has been seen to impact educational and social aspects of the youth. Spending more time outside has been seen to improve test scores and overall concentration. Having green areas is important to increase a students interest in nature and further help them understand compared to learning in a classroom. It has been studied and proven that students learn more when studying 'hands on'. At the same time, teachers and parents begin to realize the ability of education through nature. Parents and teachers are suggested to give kids an hour of play outdoors for every hour indoors. Nature Provides a wide range of materials for creativity among the human race. It is the humans choice to utilize those materials or not, however using those materials will result in a benefit of education.

See also
REAL School Gardens

Further reading
 Eames-Sheavly, M.(1999). Sowing the Seeds of Success- This 28-page booklet details the organizational steps needed to initiate a gardening project that involves kids and the community, and to ensure program success over the long term. Key chapters highlight how to define roles and responsibilities, form and manage partnerships, create an identity, raise funds, and more .
 Center for Ecoliteracy & Life Lab Science Program. Getting Started: A Guide for Creating School Gardens as Outdoor Classrooms. To order this publication, write to Life Lab Science Program or Center for Ecoliteracy  
 Williams, D. and Brown, J. (2011). "Learning Gardens and Sustainability Education: Bringing Life to Schools and Schools to Life" Review of Learning Gardens and Sustainability Education: Bringing Life to Schools and Schools to Life. « Journal of Sustainability Education.
 Wright, W. and Rowell, L. (2010). Examining the Effect of Gardening on Vegetable Consumption Among Youth in Kindergarten through Fifth Grade- This study examined the effects of gardening on elementary school youth. It relates overall vegetable consumption to widespread gardening programs. .
 Bucklin-Sporer, Arden, and Rachel Kathleen Pringle. How to Grow a School Garden: A Complete Guide for Parents and Teachers. Portland, Or.: Timber, 2010. Print. — This book is a guide about planning, starting, and maintaining school gardens for parents, teachers, and school administrators. How to Grow a School Garden: A Complete Guide for Parents and Teachers

References
 

Educational programs